Ludwig Richard Enno Littmann (16 September 1875, Oldenburg – 4 May 1958, Tübingen) was a German orientalist.

In 1906 he succeeded Theodor Nöldeke as chair of Oriental languages at the University of Strasbourg. Later on, he served as a professor of Oriental languages at the Universities of Göttingen (1914–16), Bonn (1918–21) and Tübingen (1921–49).

He deciphered and annotated Palmyrene, Nabataean and Syriac inscriptions as well as historical texts of ancient Ethiopian monuments. In 1905 he stayed among the Tigre people in Eritrea, and during the following year, directed the German Aksum-Expedition in Ethiopia. 

He published a translation of One Thousand and One Nights from Arabic into German, "Erzählungen aus den Tausendundein Nächten" (6 volumes, 1921–28, 3 1954).

Works 
 1897: "Die Pronomina in Tigré", in: Zeitschrift für Assyriologie 12, pp. 188–230, 291–316.
 1898: "Das Verbum der Tigre-Sprache", in: Zeitschrift für Assyrologie 13, pp. 133–178; 14, pp. 1–102.
 1902: (ed.) Debtera Zaneb, The chronicle of King Theodore of Abyssinia. Princeton University Library.
 1904: Philosophi abessini. (Corpus Scriptorum Christianorum Orientalium, 18–19; Scriptores Aetiopici, 1–2)
 1904: Semitic Inscriptions. New York: The Century Co. (online version at the Internet Archive)
 1905: Modern Arabic tales. – Vol. 1: Arabic Text. Leyden: Brill. (online version at the Internet Archive)
 1910–15: Publications of the Princeton expedition to Abyssinia, 4 vols. Leyden: E. J. Brill.
 1935: Abessinien. Hamburg: Hanseatische Verlagsanstalt.
 1962: (with: Höfner, M.) Wörterbuch der Tigrē-Sprache: Tigrē-Deutsch-Englisch. Wiesbaden: Franz Steiner Verlag.

References

Sources 
 Biesterfeldt, H. H. (1986). "Enno Littmann: Leben und Arbeit. Ein autobiographisches Fragment (1875–1904)", in: Oriens 29, pp. 1–101.
 Ullendorff, E. (1958). Obituary of Enno Littmann, in: Africa 28, p. 364.
 Ullendorff, E. (24 May 1958). Obituary of Enno Littmann, in: The Times.

External links 
 For more & detailed info cp. the German version of the Wikipedia entry re Enno Littmann!
 
 Enno Littmann's Biography by Eike Haberland, in Lissan Magazine (online magazine for Ethiopian art, culture & lifestyle).

1875 births
1958 deaths
German orientalists
Ethiopianists
People from Oldenburg (state)
Recipients of the Pour le Mérite (civil class)
Humboldt University of Berlin alumni
University of Greifswald alumni
Martin Luther University of Halle-Wittenberg alumni
Academic staff of the University of Strasbourg
Academic staff of the University of Göttingen
Academic staff of the University of Bonn
Academic staff of the University of Tübingen
Members of the Prussian Academy of Sciences
German male non-fiction writers
Members of the German Academy of Sciences at Berlin